INS Vela (S24) is the fourth submarine of the first batch of six s for the Indian Navy. The first cutting of steel for the submarine began on 14 July 2009, and the ship was launched on 6 May 2019.

The submarine was delivered to Indian Navy on 9 November 2021, and formally commissioned into the service by Chief of the Naval Staff Admiral Karambir Singh on 25 November.

The submarine inherits its name from INS Vela (S40) which served in the Navy from 1973–2010, and was the lead ship of the Vela-class. The crew of the INS Vela (S40) was present at the commissioning ceremony of the INS Vela (S24). Vela is the name of an Indian fish from the stingray species known for its aggression and offensive power, and the ability to camouflage itself from predators. The submarine's crest depicts the stingray swimming across the blue seas. The ship's mascot is a sub-ray, a portmanteau of submarine and stingray. The mascot symbolises the "metamorphosis of the submarine’s character with the qualities of a stingray".

See also
 List of submarines of the Indian Navy
 List of active Indian Navy ships

References

2019 ships
Ships built in India
Kalvari-class submarines
Submarines of the Indian Navy